Maikon Fernando Souza Leite (born 3 August 1988 in Mogi das Cruzes) is a Brazilian footballer who currently plays for Nacional-PB as a right winger or as a second striker.

Career
In 2019-20, he signed in for Angolan side Petro de Luanda.

Honours

Club
Santo André
Campeonato Paulista Série A2: 2006

Santos
Campeonato Paulista: 2010, 2011
Copa do Brasil: 2010
Copa Libertadores: 2011

Palmeiras
Copa do Brasil: 2012

References

Maikon Leite, nuevo jugador del Toluca‚ record.com.mx, 16 June 2016

External links

1988 births
Living people
People from Mogi das Cruzes
Brazilian footballers
Association football wingers
Association football forwards
Al-Shaab CSC players
Atlas F.C. footballers
Atlético Petróleos de Luanda players
Club Athletico Paranaense players
Clube Náutico Capibaribe players
Deportivo Toluca F.C. players
Esporte Clube Bahia players
Esporte Clube Santo André players
Sociedade Esportiva Palmeiras players
Santos FC players
Sport Club do Recife players
Ceará Sporting Club players
Figueirense FC players
Brasiliense Futebol Clube players
Grêmio Esportivo Juventus players
Interporto Futebol Clube players
Nacional Atlético Clube (Patos) players
Campeonato Brasileiro Série A players
Campeonato Brasileiro Série B players
Campeonato Brasileiro Série D players
Girabola players
Liga MX players
UAE Pro League players
Brazilian expatriate footballers
Brazilian expatriate sportspeople in Mexico
Expatriate footballers in Mexico
Brazilian expatriate sportspeople in the United Arab Emirates
Expatriate footballers in the United Arab Emirates
Brazilian expatriate sportspeople in Angola
Expatriate footballers in Angola
Footballers from São Paulo (state)